Sagebrush is the common name of several woody and herbaceous species of plants in the genus Artemisia. The best known sagebrush is the shrub Artemisia tridentata. Sagebrushes are native to the North American west.

Following is an alphabetical list of common names for various species of the genus Artemisia, along with their corresponding scientific name. Many of these species are known by more than one common name, and some common names represent more than one species.

 Alpine sagebrush—
 African sagebrush—Artemisia afra
 Basin sagebrush—Artemisia tridentata
 Big sagebrush—see Basin sagebrush
 Bigelow sagebrush—Artemisia bigelovii
 Birdfoot sagebrush—Artemisia pedatifida
 Black sagebrush—Artemisia nova
 Blue sagebrush—see Basin sagebrush
 Boreal sagebrush—Artemisia norvegica
 Budsage—Artemisia spinescens
 California sagebrush—Artemisia californica
 Carruth's sagebrush—Artemisia carruthii
 Coastal sagebrush—see California sagebrush
 Dwarf sagebrush—see Alpine sagebrush
 Fringed sagebrush—Artemisia frigida
 Gray sagewort—see White sagebrush
 Island sagebrush—Artemisia nesiotica
 Little sagebrush—Artemisia arbuscula
 Longleaf sagebrush—Artemisia longifolia
 Low sagebrush—see Little sagebrush
 Michaux sagebrush—Artemisia michauxiana
 Owyhee sagebrush—Artemisia papposa
 Prairie sagebrush—see White sagebrush
 Pygmy sagebrush—Artemisia pygmaea
 Ragweed sagebrush—Artemisia franserioides
 Sand sagebrush—Artemisia filifolia
 Scabland sagebrush—Artemisia rigida
 Silver sagebrush—Artemisia cana
 Succor Creek sagebrush—Artemisia packardiae
 Timberline sagebrush—Artemisia rothrockii
 Threetip sagebrush—Artemisia tripartita
 White sagebrush—Artemisia ludoviciana

See also  
 Sagebrush scrub
 Sagebrush steppe

References

External links 
 

Artemisia (genus)
Western (genre) staples and terminology